Tunji Oyelana   (born 4 October 1939) is a multi-award-winning Nigerian musician, actor, folk singer, composer and once a lecturer at the University of Ibadan, Nigeria. Tunji Oyelana is of the Yoruba ethnic group and is a native of Nigeria. Most of Tunji Oyelana's songs are in Yoruba. In the early 1980s, he teamed up with Nigeria's first and only winner of the Nobel Prize for Literature, Wole Soyinka, to record a musical album that satirized the corruption of the Nigerian political elite. He was the musician for Stéphane Breton's 1994 film Un dieu au bord de la route. Oyelana is credited with having sold the most albums by a Nigerian High Life musicians. In 2012 he released A Nigerian Retrospective 1966-79, an album from Soundway Records. Apart from Fela Kuti and King Sunny Ade, Oyelana is regarded as one of the most played Yoruba musicians. He and Soyinka composed I Love My Country and, in 1996, were both charged with treason and forced into exile  by Sani Abacha while touring internationally with Soyinka's play The Beatification of Area Boy. Oyelana, the leader of The Benders currently lives in the United Kingdom.

Music and film career

Orisun Masks

In the 60s, Tunji Oyelana was one of the original members of Wole Soyinka's 1960 Orisun Masks. He calls Soyinka "Ọ̀gá", meaning "boss" in Yoruba. He was one of the original Soyinka actors travelling all over the world to interpret roles in such plays as Kongi's Harvest, The Road, Madmen and Specialists and Opera Wonyosi, to the delight of audiences.

The Benders

He later burst out on his own as an ethnomusicologist, producing folk music which ruled the airwaves in the 70s and 80s with a group famously known as Tunji Oyelana and The Benders. Many of his albums would qualify as classics in their genre, deploying native wisdom, folklore and wit, mixed with sparse syncopation and antiphony, relying heavily on the human voice and its inflections to lift the spirit. Radio stations loved to play his music and listeners derived much pleasure from them.

Sura the Tailor

In the 80s, Oyelana also acted on television (NTA Ibadan particularly), perhaps the most famous of his engagements in this regard is a sitcom titled Sura de Tailor in which he played the lead role. Many would recall the theme song of that programme which soon caught on with viewers: "Sura de tailor, oko Adunni, the friend of Major, expert in Toro, danshiki, and buba, also English coat and trouser o.... Sura de Tailor is your frie-n-d."

University of Ibadan

In the 80s at the University of Ibadan, he was an artist in residence in music at the Department of Theatre Arts. As a professional artist, he helped to provide practical instruction in music. He was the music director for many of the departmental productions, scoring lyrics to beat and putting young students through; he was also a great collaborator in the production process.

Selected discography

Selected filmography

References

20th-century Nigerian male singers
Nigerian male film actors
1939 births
Living people
Yoruba-language singers
University of Ibadan people
Yoruba male actors
Nigerian male television actors
Nigerian male musicians
Nigerian folklorists
Nigerian composers
Male actors in Yoruba cinema
Nigerian television actors
20th-century births